Jiangwangmiao station, is a station on Line 4 of the Nanjing Metro that opened in January 2017 along with eighteen other stations as part of Line 4's first phase. It is located underneath Jiangwangmiao Avenue on an east–west axis and within walking distance of Purple Mountain. Jiangwangmiao Station was originally named "Yingtuocun" Station during Line 4's planning phase.

References

Railway stations in Jiangsu
Railway stations in China opened in 2017
Nanjing Metro stations